The table below lists the judgments of the Constitutional Court of South Africa delivered in 2000.

The members of the court during 2000 were President Arthur Chaskalson, Deputy President Pius Langa, and judges Lourens Ackermann, Richard Goldstone, Johann Kriegler, Tholie Madala, Yvonne Mokgoro, Sandile Ngcobo, Kate O'Regan, Albie Sachs and Zak Yacoob.

References
 
 

2000
Constitutional Court
Constitutional Court of South Africa